Jennifer Holland (born November 9, 1987) is an American actress and model. She is best known for her work as Emilia Harcourt in the DC Extended Universe productions The Suicide Squad (2021), Peacemaker, Black Adam (both 2022), and Shazam! Fury of the Gods (2023). She also appeared as Ashley in the sex comedy film American Pie Presents: The Book of Love (2009).

Career 
Holland moved to Los Angeles at the age of seventeen to pursue a career in acting. She has a background in gymnastics.

In 2008, Holland appeared in the short film Assorted Nightmares: Janitor, voicing the character Kate. In 2017, she starred as Becky Phillips in the limited series Sun Records. In 2021, she appeared in the superhero film The Suicide Squad as Emilia Harcourt. In 2022, she reprised her role in the HBO Max television series Peacemaker and the film Black Adam. Holland was ranked 34 in IMDB's "Top 100 Stars of 2022" list.

Personal life 
Holland began a relationship with writer/director James Gunn in 2015. They met through actor Michael Rosenbaum who was dating a friend of Holland's at the time and offered to set them up after Gunn saw a photo of her that Rosenbaum had. In February 2022, Holland and Gunn became engaged, and were married at the end of September 2022. Her mother is a nurse.

Filmography

Film

Television

Web
 Level 26: Dark Revelations (2011), as Simone, in episode: "Cyber-bridge Five"

References

External links
 

1987 births
21st-century American actresses
Actresses from Chicago
American film actresses
American television actresses
Living people